Maureen Reillette "Rebbie" Jackson-Brown (born May 29, 1950) is an American singer and the eldest child of the Jackson family of musicians. She first performed on stage with her siblings during shows in Las Vegas, Nevada, at the MGM Grand Hotel and Casino in 1974, before subsequently appearing in the television series The Jacksons. Her sister La Toya was born on her sixth birthday. At age 34, Jackson released her debut album Centipede (1984). The album featured songs written by Smokey Robinson, Prince, and Jackson's younger brother Michael, whose contribution (the title track "Centipede") became Rebbie's most successful single release. By the end of the 1980s, the singer had released two more albums in quick succession: Reaction (1986) and R U Tuff Enuff (1988).

Following a 7-year hiatus in her musical career, Jackson returned with a cover of "Forever Young" for the Free Willy 2: The Adventure Home soundtrack before the release of the 1998 album Yours Faithfully three years later. The production of the album, her last to date, was a collaboration with artists and producers such as Men of Vizion's Spanky Williams, Keith Thomas, and Eliot Kennedy. It also featured contributions from her children. In 2011, Rebbie embarked on the Pick Up the Phone Tour, which is dedicated to teens from all over the U.S. who have committed suicide.

Life and career

Childhood and youth

Maureen Reillette Jackson was born at 2300 Jackson Street in Gary, Indiana from a working-class family on May 29, 1950. She is first daughter of Joseph Walter "Joe" (July 26, 1928 - June 27, 2018), and Katherine Esther (née Scruse, May 4, 1930), she is the eldest of their 10 children. Her siblings are Jackie, Tito, Jermaine, La Toya, Marlon, Brandon (d. March 12, 1957), Michael (d. June 25, 2009), Randy, and Janet. 

Joseph was a steel mill employee who often performed in a rhythm and blues (R&B) band called the Falcons with his brother, Luther. Katherine is a Jehovah's Witness and raised her children to follow the religion. Rebbie, La Toya, and Michael became the most devout of the children as time progressed. Reflecting on her early life, Rebbie acknowledged in a 1980s magazine interview that her role within the family had been that of a "second mother" to her younger siblings, whom she would often babysit, along with her eldest brother Jackie. She graduated from Theodore Roosevelt High school in Gary in 1968.

Early career
Jackson began her singing career in 1974, performing with her siblings in Las Vegas. The Vegas shows had initially begun in April, without Rebbie; due to a sprained ankle, Rebbie's debut was postponed until June. Her five brothers were the main draws, with Rebbie, Randy, Janet, and La Toya serving as fillers for the performances.

When the Jackson 5 parted with their record label Motown in 1976, they signed to CBS Records and rebranded themselves The Jacksons. Additionally, the brothers were signed to CBS-TV to star with their family in a variety series called The Jacksons. The show premiered in June 1976 and featured all of the siblings excluding Jermaine, who had chosen to stay with Motown. The initial series run of the 30-minute programs was four weeks. Due to ratings success, more episodes were ordered in January 1977. The show marked the first time that an African-American family had ever starred in a television series. The run of programs concluded shortly afterward.

Prior to the series, Jackson had thought of her singing as merely a private hobby. Her television experience, as well as an early love of musicals, motivated her to become a professional recording artist, and the show's producer encouraged her to sing. Jackson served as a backing vocalist for several musicians around this time, as well as a cabaret singer. She contributed her voice for songs by such artists as The Emotions, Sonny Bono, and Betty Wright before her second pregnancy stalled her musical career for a short time.

Centipede
Following years of preparation, Jackson's debut album Centipede was released in October 1984 by Columbia Records, which had signed her as a solo artist two years previously. The album was only released once the singer had ensured that family life was secure, and that she had spent time with her children during their important younger years. Centipede became a moderate chart success, reaching number 13 on Billboard's Top R&B/Hip-Hop Albums chart and number 63 on its Top 200. The recording of the album had been a family affair; it involved several contributions from her relatives. Her husband Nathaniel Brown (1949-2013) co-wrote the song "Come Alive Saturday Night" with two of his wife's brothers, Randy and Tito. The latter Jackson also penned "Hey Boy" with his wife Dee Dee. The most successful song from the album was the million-selling title track, "Centipede". Written, arranged, and produced by Michael, the song also featured Jackson's famous brother and The Weather Girls on backing vocals. It reached number 4 on the Black Singles Chart and was subsequently certified gold by the Recording Industry Association of America. "Centipede" marked Michael's first effort at writing and producing since the release of his successful Thriller (1982).

Other tracks from Rebbie's album included cover versions of songs by Prince ("I Feel for You") and Smokey Robinson and the Miracles ("A Fork in the Road"). The album received mixed reviews from journalists and music critics. According to Jet magazine, Centipede marked Jackson's emergence as a "legitimate recording artist" and "cleared the major hurdle of demonstrating that she [was] talented and marketable." With the album, Jackson became the last of her siblings to embark on a recording career and the last in line to release hit material.

Rebbie later revealed that several discussions occurred at the time of the release of Centipede over whether she should use the Jackson surname professionally or not. To begin with, Rebbie did not want to use her maiden surname, but later reasoned that it was silly to deny her heritage. Jackson stated that she did, however, compromise with the use of her family name on the Centipede album cover, explaining, "Rebbie is large and Jackson is small." She further stated that the success of siblings Michael and Janet had not been a hindrance to her, but served as an enhancement to her career. Rebbie added that she did not have to worry about "name recognition."

Reaction and R U Tuff Enuff
Reaction served as the follow-up album to Centipede, and was released in October 1986. It was recorded at Tito's Ponderosa Studios in Los Angeles, California. Tito produced Reaction along with David Conley and David Townsend of the R&B group Surface. Duets were featured on the album, including one with Cheap Trick lead singer Robin Zander, and another with Isaac Hayes. The Zander-Jackson collaboration ("You Send the Rain Away") was released as a single, and peaked at number 50 on the R&B singles chart. Jackson's duet with Hayes, the ballad "Tonight I'm Yours," was not released as a single, though received substantial airplay. Reaction'''s title track ("Reaction") was the most popular hit from the album, reaching number 16 on the R&B singles chart.

The album R U Tuff Enuff succeeded Reaction upon its release in July 1988. Jackson was more involved with the production of this album than she had been on her previous releases. She stated at the time of R U Tuff Enuff's distribution that the sound on the album differed from anything she had done previously. Jackson commented that the album was "more versatile," while noting that it resembled other albums because it contained a lot of dance music. Two singles were released from the album and charted on the R&B singles chart: "Plaything," which made it into the top 10, and the title track "R U Tuff Enuff," which peaked at number 78. By mid-June 1988, R U Tuff Enuff had reportedly sold 300,000 copies. MTV later concluded that the album "struggled". Jackson lent her vocals to "2300 Jackson Street" (the title track of her brothers' 2300 Jackson Street album), before taking a hiatus from releasing music. Jackson later stated that she performed around the world during this break.

Return to Music and Yours Faithfully
 Following a 7-year break, Jackson returned with a cover of Bob Dylan's "Forever Young" for the 1995 film Free Willy 2: The Adventure Home. She was later signed to her brother Michael's record label MJJ Music and the first album in 10 years, Yours Faithfully, was released on March 31, 1998. It featured a remixed version of Jackson's successful "Centipede." Initially, the singer had not wanted to feature the track, believing that it was part of the past. After thinking about it for a while, Jackson felt that the inclusion of the remix—which features a rap by son Austin—would be a good way to return to the music scene. In addition, her two other children, Stacee and Yashi, contributed backing vocals for the album. Other tracks from the album included "Fly Away," which was written and produced by brother Michael, who also served as co-executive producer for Yours Faithfully. Fellow producers included Keith Thomas and Eliot Kennedy. The album also featured a duet with Men of Vizion's Spanky Williams on the Spinners' "I Don't Want to Lose You," which Jet described as being a "sizzling" rendition. Yours Faithfully title track was released as a single and peaked at number 76 on the R&B chart. Vibe'' magazine's Quohnos Mitchell expressed disappointment in the album, calling its content a "mix of dated R&B grooves dressed up with a few cleverly placed samples."

Death of Michael Jackson
Rebbie's brother Michael died on June 25, 2009, after suffering a cardiac arrest. His memorial service was held 12 days later on July 7, and the finale featured group renditions of the Jackson anthems "We Are the World" and "Heal the World." The singalong featured Michael's siblings (including Rebbie) and the late singer's children. Following the service—which was held at Los Angeles' Staples Center—Rebbie, along with sisters Janet and La Toya, addressed fans at the nearby L.A. Live entertainment complex, stating, "We are extremely grateful for all the support. We love you all." In the weeks following Michael's death, it was speculated by media sources that Rebbie would be the primary caregiver for her late brother's children, Prince, Paris, and Blanket. It was stated that even if Michael and Rebbie's mother Katherine were granted custody of the children, Rebbie would care for the siblings on a day-to-day basis at the Jackson family's Encino home. Katherine was named their legal guardian in August 2009. In early 2011, Rebbie announced she'd begun recording tracks for a new album, her first in 14 years. She also performed throughout the U.S. with a setlist containing her best-known songs, some of her brothers' songs, and some Motown classics.

Voice type 
Rebbie Jackson is a contralto with a three-octave range. She has an impressive belting range, reaching up to G#5 in her song "Reaction".

Personal life

The 18-year-old Rebbie's announcement that she wanted to marry her childhood love Nathaniel Brown in November 1968 created division in the Jackson family. Jackson expressed her feelings for the man, and proclaimed that she wanted to move with him to Kentucky. Katherine encouraged her daughter to proceed, feeling that being a wife and mother were important roles for all of her daughters. But Joseph opposed the marriage; he wanted Rebbie to follow in her brothers' footsteps and become a singer and felt that married life would stop her from becoming a success in the entertainment business. Rebbie had taken clarinet, piano, and dance lessons in her childhood, but had no interest in a music career, even though, according to Jermaine, she had won several singing contests dueting with Jackie. She thought a happy home was more comforting and secure than the instability of show business. She also wanted to leave her family's drama-filled home on Jackson Street and escape her controlling father. Arguments ensued for several weeks before her father relented and allowed Rebbie to marry Brown, but he refused to walk her down the aisle.

Jackson and Brown had three children:

 Stacee Brown (born May 5, 1971). 
 Yashi Brown (born October 5, 1977). 
 Austin Brown (born November 22, 1985).

Nathaniel Brown died of cancer on January 6, 2013.

Discography

Albums

Singles

Footnotes

References

External links
Rebbie Jackson at Allmusic
 

1950 births
20th-century American singers
20th-century American women singers
21st-century American singers
21st-century American women singers
Actresses from Gary, Indiana
Actresses from Los Angeles
African-American actresses
African-American women singers
American contemporary R&B singers
American contraltos
American dance musicians
American Jehovah's Witnesses
American people who self-identify as being of Native American descent
American rhythm and blues singers
American soul singers
American women pop singers
Columbia Records artists
Rebbie Jackson
Living people
Musicians from Gary, Indiana
Singers from Indiana
Singers from Los Angeles